Undead Labs LLC is an American video game developer based in Seattle, Washington. The company was founded in November 2009 by Jeff Strain and developed the State of Decay series. In 2018, Undead Labs became part of Microsoft Studios (now known as Xbox Game Studios).

History
Undead Labs was founded on November 23, 2009, by Jeff Strain, with the sole focus on zombie-based games. On February 3, 2011 Undead Labs announced that they were partnering with Microsoft Game Studios to publish their games on the Xbox 360 and now also the Xbox One. This decision was made after most of the other publishers who showed interest in their games were requesting what they described as "World of Warcraft clones". The first game State of Decay was released on the Xbox 360 on June 5, 2013 and on Microsoft Windows on November 5, 2013.

On January 11, 2014 it was announced that Undead Labs has signed a multi-year, multi-title agreement with Microsoft Studios. Jeff Strain stated that the first State of Decay was "just the start of (Undead Labs') long-term ambitions", and spoke of many future titles potentially entering the franchise.

At E3 2018, Microsoft announced they had entered into an agreement to acquire Undead Labs into Microsoft Studios. In 2020, the studio announced their next title State of Decay 3 for Xbox Series X/S and PC. In July 2021 Undead Labs opened a second studio in Orlando, Florida focused on developing animation technology in Unreal Engine 5 for Undead Labs as well as for other studios under the Xbox Game Studios banner.

Strain left the company by October 2021 and founded another studio, Possibility Space.

A 2022 investigation by Kotaku reported on a sexist studio culture, which was abetted by Philip Holt, the new studio head who replaced Strain, and then-head of HR Anne Schlosser. Schlosser was removed after a Microsoft HR investigation. The toxic work environment, which continued after Schlosser's departure, led to a high employee turnover rate, especially among experienced staff. These issues, combined with a lack of design vision, contributed to extensive delays in the development of State of Decay 3. Employees also blamed Microsoft for not living up to its goals of diversity, equity, and inclusion by not responding to reports of abuse in a timely manner.

Games developed

References

External links
 

2009 establishments in Washington (state)
2018 mergers and acquisitions
American companies established in 2009
Companies based in Seattle
First-party video game developers
Microsoft subsidiaries
Video game companies established in 2009
Video game companies of the United States
Video game development companies
Xbox Game Studios